The  was an infantry division in the Imperial Japanese Army. It was created 4 April 1944 in Sendai to replace 43rd division and disbanded in September 1945 in Fukushima. It was a triangular division. The men of the division were drafted through 2nd military district, located in Sendai.

Action
After completing the training with the Eastern District Army, the 72nd division was attached to Japanese Eleventh Area Army from 1 February 1945 and sent to Fukushima. By the time of surrender of Japan in August 1945, the division was sent again to reinforce positions in Aomori in anticipation of the Allied invasion which never came.

See also
 List of Japanese Infantry Divisions
 Independent Mixed Brigades (Imperial Japanese Army)

Notes and references

This article incorporates material from the article 第72師団 (日本軍) in the Japanese Wikipedia, retrieved on 14 January 2015.
 Madej, W. Victor. Japanese Armed Forces Order of Battle, 1937-1945 [2 vols] Allentown, PA: 1981

Japanese World War II divisions
Infantry divisions of Japan
Military units and formations established in 1944
Military units and formations disestablished in 1945
1942 establishments in Japan
1945 disestablishments in Japan